Orlin Anastassov (Bulgarian: Орлин Анастасов) (born 1976) is a Bulgarian opera singer with an active international career performing leading bass roles. A winner of the 1999 Operalia competition, he has also performed many times as the bass soloist in the Verdi Requiem.

Life and career
Anastassov was born in Russe, a city in northeastern Bulgaria. Both his parents were opera singers. He made had his operatic debut at the age of 20 as The King of Egypt in Aida at the Rousse State Opera. He won First Prize in the 1999 Operalia competition, and went on to make his debut at La Scala in Milan as Don Basilio in The Barber of Seville that same year. He has since returned there as Timur in Turandot (2004), as Ramfis in Aida (2007), and in the title role of Attila (2011). He has also performed at The Royal Opera House in London, New York's Metropolitan Opera House, the Vienna Staatsoper and other major houses around the world.

Recordings
Berlioz: Roméo et Juliette – 2000 (bass soloist). London Symphony Orchestra and Chorus, Colin Davis (conductor). Label: LSO Live CD 3 
Berlioz: Les Troyens – 2001 (as L'ombre d'Hector). London Symphony Orchestra and Chorus, Colin Davis (conductor). Winner of the 2001 Grammy Awards for "Best Classical Album" and "Best Opera Recording. Label: LSO Live CD 10
Verdi: I Vespri Siciliani – 2003 (as Procida). Arturo Toscanini Foundation Orchestra and Chorus, Stefano Ranzani (conductor). Label: Dynamic DVD 33551 
Verdi: Nabucco – 2004 (as Zaccaria). Teatro Carlo Felice Orchestra and Chorus, Riccardo Frizza (conductor). Label: Dynamic DVD 33465
Verdi: Aida –  2006 (as Ramfis). Théâtre de la Monnaie Orchestra and Chorus, Kazushi Ono (conductor). Label: Opus Arte DVD 954 
 Mussorgsky: Boris Godunov – 2011 (as Boris Godunov). Teatro Regio di Torino Orchestra and Chorus, Gianandrea Noseda (conductor). Label: Opus Arte DVD 1053

References

Operatic basses
1976 births
Living people
21st-century Bulgarian  male opera singers
20th-century Bulgarian  male opera singers